The Le Rhône 9J is a nine-cylinder rotary aircraft engine produced in France by Gnome et Rhône. Also known as the Le Rhône 110 hp in a reference to its nominal power rating, the engine was fitted to a number of military aircraft types of the First World War. Le Rhône 9J engines were produced under license in Great Britain by W.H. Allen Son & Company of Bedford, and in Germany by Motorenfabrik Oberursel where it was sold as the Oberursel Ur.II.

In common with other Le Rhône series engines, the 9J featured highly visible copper induction pipes and used a single push-pull rod to operate its two overhead valves. The main visual difference between the 9J and the earlier, less powerful Le Rhône 9C engine is that the copper intake manifold tubing (with round section lower ends) on the 110 hp 9J is attached to the crankcase behind the cylinders, whereas on the 9C (80 hp) the intake manifolds (with rectangular lower ends) are fully visible from the front.

Examples of Le Rhône 9J engines are on public display in aviation museums, with several remaining airworthy, powering restored and authentic reproductions of vintage aircraft.

Variants
Le Rhône 9Ja
(1916) , nine-cylinder rotary engine. 953 built by W.H. Allen Son & Co.
Le Rhône 9Jb
(1916) , nine-cylinder rotary engine.
Le Rhône 9Jby
(1916) , nine-cylinder rotary engine.
Le Rhône M-2 production in the USSR post-WWI,

Applications

Le Rhône 9Ja

Le Rhône 9Jb
Morane-Saulnier AC
Nieuport 17, 23 and 23bis
Nieuport 24 and 24bis
Nieuport 27
Le Rhône 9Jby
Sopwith Camel
Bristol Scout

Oberursel Ur.II
Fokker D.VI (first prototype)
Fokker D.VIII
Fokker Dr.I
Fokker S.IV
Fokker V.9
Fokker V.16
Fokker V.17
Fokker V.25
Fokker V.33

Survivors

A Bristol M.1 replica, owned and operated by the Shuttleworth Collection remains airworthy and is powered by a Le Rhône 9J engine. The collection's airworthy Avro 504 is also powered by a 110 hp Le Rhône rotary engine. The reproduction Avro 504 at Old Rhinebeck Aerodrome has also flown with an original Le Rhone 9J powerplant, as was Cole Palen's first reproduction Fokker Dr.I triplane (now retired) for Old Rhinebeck's airshows in the 1960s, bearing American registration N3221.

A full-scale Nieuport 11 replica built by Walt Pfeifer and Joe Pfeifer in the early 1960s, now operated by The Vintage Aviator Limited, flies in New Zealand with a Le Rhone 9C.

Engines on display
Preserved Le Rhône 9J engines are on public display at the following museums:
Steven F. Udvar-Hazy Center
Shuttleworth Collection
Museum of Hungarian Aviation
Museo Nacional de Aeronáutica de Argentina, Buenos Aires, Argentina

Specifications (Le Rhône 9Ja)

See also

References

Notes

Bibliography

 Lumsden, Alec. British Piston Engines and their Aircraft. Marlborough, Wiltshire: Airlife Publishing, 2003. .
 Gunston, Bill. World Encyclopedia of Aero Engines. Cambridge, England. Patrick Stephens Limited, 1989.

External links

Le Rhône rotary engine - Images and description 
YouTube Video of Le Rhône 9J-powered Old Rhinebeck Aerodrome Avro 504
New-build reproduction Oberursel Ur.II rotary engine run-up from New Zealand

1910s aircraft piston engines
9J
Rotary aircraft piston engines